Tale of Tales (Skazka skazok) is a 1979 Soviet/Russian animated film directed by Yuri Norstein and produced by the Soyuzmultfilm studio in Moscow. It has won numerous awards, has been acclaimed by critics and other animators, and has received the title of greatest animated film of all time in various polls. It has been the subject of a 2005 book by Clare Kitson titled Yuri Norstein and Tale of Tales: An Animator's Journey.

Plot
Tale of Tales, like Andrei Tarkovsky's Mirror, attempts to structure itself like a human memory. Memories are not recalled in neat chronological order; instead, they are recalled by the association of one thing with another, which means that any attempt to put memory on film cannot be told like a conventional narrative. The film is thus made up of a series of related sequences whose scenes are interspersed between each other. One of the primary themes involves war, with particular emphasis on the enormous losses the Soviet Union suffered on the Eastern Front during World War II. Several recurring characters and their interactions make up a large part of the film, such as the poet, the little girl and the bull, the little boy and the crows, the dancers and the soldiers, the train, the apples and especially the little grey wolf (syeryenkiy volchok).

Yuri Norstein wrote in Iskusstvo Kino magazine that the film is "about simple concepts that give you the strength to live."

Music and poetry
In addition to the original score composed by Mikhail Meyerovich, this film makes use of several other pieces of music. Excerpts from works by Bach (notably the E flat minor Prelude BWV 853 (from The Well-Tempered Clavier)) and Mozart (the Andante second movement from Piano Concerto No. 4 in G major, K41) are used, and the World War II era tango Weary Sun, written by Jerzy Petersburski, features prominently. However, the most important musical inspiration is the following traditional Russian lullaby, which is included in the film in both instrumental and vocal form.

Many situations in the film actually derive from this lullaby, as well as the character of the little grey wolf. Indeed, the film's original title (rejected by the Soviet censors) was The Little Grey Wolf Will Come.

The name Tale of Tales came from a poem of the same name by Turkish poet Nazım Hikmet that Norstein loved since 1962.

Awards
1980—Lille (France) International Festival of Films: Jury Grand Prize
1980—Zagreb World Festival of Animated Films: Grand Prize
1980—Ottawa (Canada) International Animation Festival: Best Film Longer Than Three Minutes Award
1984—Los Angeles Olympic Arts Festival: voted by large international jury to be the greatest animated film of all time
2002—Zagreb World Festival of Animated Films: again voted by large international jury to be the greatest animated film of all time

Creators

In popular culture
Australian electronic duo The Presets paid homage to Tale of Tales in the music video for their song "Girl and the Sea" from their album Beams.

See also

History of Russian animation
List of films considered the best
List of films based on poems
List of stop-motion films
Hedgehog in the Fog, another Yuri Norstein film from 1975
Arthouse animation

References

External links
Tale of Tales at the Animator.ru
Comparison of various DVDs containing the film (in Russian, but with helpful pictures)

Tale of Tales with English subtitles

1979 films
Cutout animation films
Russian animated short films
Soviet avant-garde and experimental films
Films based on poems
Films directed by Yuri Norstein
1970s Russian-language films
Soviet animated films
1970s stop-motion animated films
1979 animated films
Animated films about wolves
Soyuzmultfilm
Films about memory
Eastern Front of World War II films
Russian World War II films
Soviet World War II films
Animated films about trains